The Širvinta is a river in Lithuania. Stretching for 129 km, it is the longest tributary of the Šventoji. Its source is in the hinterlands of the Širvintos district. After it passes through the town of Širvintos, where a low head dam has been built, it continues through the Ukmergė district, and borders the Jonava district. It ends when it flows into the Šventoji between Upninkai and Vepriai.

The Širvinta has a rapid flow and winding rocky bed, which is used by kayakers. The Širvinta Landscape Reserve, encompassing the river banks and escarpments of the Širvinta, was established in 1992 to protect the channel's unique landscape. Some of the loamy scarps near Upninkai reach as high as 40 metres.

References 

Rivers of Lithuania